5th Gear is the sixth studio album by American country music singer Brad Paisley. It was released June 19, 2007, by Arista Nashville and debuted at number three on the Billboard 200, with first week sales of about 197,000 copies. On April 9, 2008, 5th Gear was certified platinum by the RIAA.

The album's first four singles — "Ticks", "Online", "Letter to Me", and "I'm Still a Guy" — all reached Number One on the Billboard Hot Country Songs charts. In June 2008, a re-recording of "Waitin' on a Woman", a song which Paisley originally recorded for his 2005 album Time Well Wasted, was added as a bonus track to this album. This re-edited version was released in June 2008 as the album's fifth single. For the chart week of September 20, 2008, the song has become his twelfth number-one single and his eighth straight number-one hit. When pre-ordered through iTunes, another bonus track, "You Love Me So Good", was included.

In 2009, NPR picked the album as one of "The Decade's 50 Most Important Recordings." "Oh Love" received a Grammy Award for Best Country Collaboration with Vocals nomination.

Blaine Larsen later released a rendition of "It Did" in 2009.

Track listing

"Mr. Policeman" incorporates the chorus of "In the Jailhouse Now" at its end, with new lyrics to fit the rest of the song.

Personnel
 Brad Paisley – lead vocals (1-12, 14, 15, 16), electric guitar (1-12, 14, 16), acoustic guitar (1-6, 8-12, 15), voice (17)
 Gordon Mote – acoustic piano (1, 5, 7, 8, 9, 11, 12, 14), clavinet (2), keyboards (5), music box (5)
 Tim Lauer – keyboards (3, 10, 16)
 Jim "Moose" Brown – Hammond B3 organ (3), Wurlitzer organ (4), acoustic piano (10, 15)
 Gary Hooker – electric guitar (1, 5, 6, 11), baritone guitar (2), 12 string guitar (2)
 Randle Currie – steel guitar (1-9, 11, 12, 14, 16)
 Ron Block – banjo (2, 4)
 Kendal Marcy – banjo (8, 16)
 Bryan Sutton – mandolin (4, 6), banjo (6), acoustic guitar (7, 14)
 Mike Johnson – dobro (6, 10, 15)
 Kevin "Swine" Grantt – electric bass (1-12, 14, 16), upright bass (2, 15)
 Kenny Lewis – additional bass guitar (16)
 Ben Sesar – drums (1-12, 14, 15, 16)
 Eric Darken – percussion (1-12, 14, 15, 16)
 Justin Williamson – fiddle (1, 3-6, 8, 9, 11, 12, 14), mandolin (2)
 Aubrey Haynie – fiddle (7, 10, 14), mandolin (10, 15)
 Tom Baldrica – tuba (3)
 Wes Hightower – backing vocals (1-12, 14, 15)
 Vicki Hampton – backing vocals (3)
 Carrie Underwood – backing vocals (3), lead vocals (10)
 Little Jimmy Dickens – voice (17, 18)

Brentwood High School Band on "Online"
 Chris Brooks, Jay Dawson and Kristin Wilkinson – arrangements 
 Kristin Wilkinson – coordinator
 Randy Box – conductor 
 Chris Brooks – drums 
 Jay Dawson – mellophone
 Sam Levine – saxophone 
 Roy Agee – trombone 
 Mike Haynes – trumpet 
 Joe Murphy – tuba

The Kung Pao Buckaroos (Track 13)
 Little Jimmy Dickens, Bill Anderson, George Jones and Dolly Parton

The New Kung Pao Buckaroos on "Bigger Fish to Fry"
 Little Jimmy Dickens, Bill Anderson and Vince Gill

Production 
 Frank Rogers – producer 
 Chris DuBois – executive producer 
 Jim Catino – A&R 
 Richard Barrow – recording, overdub recording 
 Brian David Willis – recording, overdub recording, digital editing 
 Neal Cappellino – overdub recording
 Jason Lehning – overdub recording
 Steve Marcantonio – overdub recording
 Matt Coles – overdub recording assistant
 Seth Morton – overdub recording assistant
 Mark Petaccia – overdub recording assistant
 Steve Short – overdub recording assistant, recording assistant 
 Brady Barnett – digital editing 
 Tyler Moles – digital editing
 Justin Niebank – mixing 
 Drew Bollman – mix assistant 
 Hank Williams – mastering 
 MasterMix (Nashville, Tennessee) – mastering location 
 Astrid May – art direction 
 Katherine Stratton – design 
 Brad Paisley – cover design, packaging design 
 David McClister – photography

Chart performance

Weekly charts

Year-end charts

Singles

Certifications

References

2007 albums
Brad Paisley albums
Arista Records albums
Albums produced by Frank Rogers (record producer)